Echinodiaceae is a monogeneric family of moss from the order Hypnobryales. It is found worldwide (especially the Americas and Oceania).

Classification 
It has only 1 genus:

Echinodium

References

Hypnales
Moss families
Monogeneric plant families